Rafael Lacayo (born 19 November 1998) is a Nicaraguan sports shooter. He competed in the men's 10 metre air pistol event at the 2016 Summer Olympics. He finished 39th in the qualifying round and did not advance to the finals. He was the flagbearer for Nicaragua during the Parade of Nations.

References

External links
 

1998 births
Living people
Nicaraguan male sport shooters
Olympic shooters of Nicaragua
Shooters at the 2016 Summer Olympics
Place of birth missing (living people)
Shooters at the 2015 Pan American Games
Shooters at the 2019 Pan American Games
Pan American Games competitors for Nicaragua